The Mortician is a 2011 British thriller film written and directed by Gareth Maxwell Roberts and starring Method Man, Dash Mihok, Dana Fuchs and Edward Furlong.

Cast
Method Man as The Mortician
Dash Mihok as Carver
E. J. Bonilla as Noah
Judy Marte as Jenny
Angelic Zambrana as Maria
Wendell Pierce as Clinger
Dana Fuchs as Eva
Edward Furlong as Petrovski
Cruz Santiago as Kane

References

External links
 
 

2011 films
British thriller films
2010s English-language films
2010s British films